Antoinette van Hoytema (1875-1967) was a Dutch painter.

Biography 
Hoytema was born on 6 December 1875 in Delft. She studied with Henk Bremmer. She was a member of the Federatie van Verenigingen van Beroeps Beeldende Kunstenaars (Amsterdam), and 'Kunstenaarsvereniging .  Hoytema's work was included in the 1939 exhibition and sale Onze Kunst van Heden (Our Art of Today) at the Rijksmuseum in Amsterdam.

Hoytema died on 30 September 1967 in The Hague.

References

External links
images of Hoytema's art on Invaluable

1875 births
1967 deaths
People from Delft
Dutch women artists